Patricia S. Klee is a New Hampshire politician.

Career
On November 8, 2016, Klee was elected to the New Hampshire House of Representatives where she represents the Hillsborough 30 district. She assumed office later in 2016. She is a Democrat. Klee is also currently serves the Nashua Board of Aldermen where she represents the 3rd ward.

Personal life
Klee resides in Nashua, New Hampshire.

References

Living people
Politicians from Nashua, New Hampshire
Women state legislators in New Hampshire
Democratic Party members of the New Hampshire House of Representatives
21st-century American politicians
21st-century American women politicians
Year of birth missing (living people)